The 1996 IAAF World Road Relay Championships was the third edition of the global, international marathon relay competition, organised by the International Association of Athletics Federations (IAAF). The event took place on 13–14 April on the streets of Copenhagen, Denmark with the participation of 282 athletes (174 men and 108 women) from 34 nations. The women's race took place on Saturday 13 April and the men's race took place on Sunday 14 April.

Each national team consisted of six athletes, who alternately covered six stages to complete the 42.195 km marathon distance. The first, third and fifth stages were of 5 km, the second and fourth stages were of 10 km, and the final stage covered the remaining 7.195 km.

In the women's race, Genet Gebregiorgis and Berhane Adere established a 38-second lead for Ethiopia over the first two legs. The nation dominated the competition to win in a championship record of 2:16:04, having the fastest runner in every stage, bar an interruption of Italy's Silvia Sommaggio on the third leg. The Romanian and Japanese teams traded places for the runner-up spot, but a decisive final leg by Elena Fidatov brought the Romanians the silver medals by a margin of 17 seconds.

In the men's race, it was the Kenyan team that dominated, with Simon Rono and Joseph Kimani establishing a lead of 41 seconds over the first two stages and David Kipruto grabbing the fastest time in the fifth stage. The Brazilians closed the gap slightly in the mid-race thanks to Delmir dos Santos, but ultimately ended up runners-up with a time of 2:01:24 hours behind Kenya's 2:00:40. Ethiopia and the hosts Denmark battled for the bronze position throughout the race but a strong final leg by Ethiopia's Worku Bikila resulted in a time of 2:01:50 hours, putting clear distance between the two teams.

Medal summary

Stage winners

Results

Men's race

Women's race

References

1996
World Road Relay Championships
World Road Relay Championships
World Road Relay Championships
April 1996 sports events in Europe
International sports competitions in Copenhagen
International athletics competitions hosted by Denmark
Marathons in Denmark